Oddbjørn Snøfugl (born 2 October 1941) is a Norwegian politician for the Centre Party.

He served as a deputy representative to the Parliament of Norway from Sør-Trøndelag during the term 1969–1973. In total he met during 6 days of parliamentary session. He resides in Støren.

References

1941 births
Living people
People from Midtre Gauldal
Deputy members of the Storting
Centre Party (Norway) politicians
Sør-Trøndelag politicians